The Studio Albums 1989–2007 is a box set by the Canadian rock band Rush. It contains the band's seven studio albums released from 1989 to 2007 and was released on 7 CDs on 30 September, 2013. The albums are Presto (1989), Roll the Bones (1991), Counterparts (1993), Test for Echo (1996), Vapor Trails (2002), Feedback (2004) and Snakes & Arrows (2007).

There is also a booklet included with lyrics to every album, with the exception of Feedback.

The version of Vapor Trails on this box set is the remixed version.

Reception

Gregory Heaney of AllMusic gave the box set 4 out of 5 stars. He said that of most interest to Rush fans in the box set will be the remixed version of Vapor Trails.

Track listing

Presto (1989)

Roll the Bones (1991)

Counterparts (1993)

Test for Echo (1996)

Vapor Trails (2002) [2013 remixed version]

Feedback (2004)

Snakes & Arrows (2007)

References

2013 compilation albums
Rush (band) compilation albums
Anthem Records compilation albums
Atlantic Records compilation albums